Károly Kocsis (born 27 July 1929) is a Hungarian gymnast. He competed in eight events at the 1952 Summer Olympics.

References

External links
 

1929 births
Living people
Hungarian male artistic gymnasts
Olympic gymnasts of Hungary
Gymnasts at the 1952 Summer Olympics
Sportspeople from Debrecen